True and the Rainbow Kingdom is an animated children's web series produced by Home Plate Entertainment and Guru Studio in collaboration with American artist duo FriendsWithYou and Pharrell Williams' I Am Other. Based on the artwork by FriendsWithYou, it aired on CBC Television in Canada, WIPR-TV in Puerto Rico and Netflix in the United States and internationally.

The 10-episode first season of the series was released on Netflix on August 11, 2017, which led to two five-episode spin-off series, Season 2, titled True: Magical Friends and True: Wonderful Wishes, both of which debuted on June 15, 2018. The series was renewed for a 4-episode second season of the series, titled Mushroom Town, which was released on Netflix on May 3, 2019. True Tunes was released on July 12 on Netflix, with 8 new tracks. The series finale, titled Wild Yetis, was released on August 30, 2019.

The series was broadcast in the UK as a TV show on Tiny Pop from April 4, 2020 until April 23, 2022.

Plot
True and the Rainbow Kingdom follows True and her best friend Bartleby the Cat, as they help the whimsical citizens of the Rainbow Kingdom, a wondrous, colorful universe filled with delightful and fantastical citizens. True is the only one with the ability to activate the magical powers of The Wishes of the Wishing Tree, solve problems in the Rainbow Kingdom, and empower viewers with her imagination, mindfulness, and empathy.

Development and production
The series was originally announced in March 2013. Titled Wish Come True at that time after the eponymous designer toys by FriendsWithYou, it was planned to have 10 half-hour episodes in a season, as produced by Home Plate Entertainment.

In June 2015, TVO has announced 5 new titles for their line-up of preschool series. Among them was True and the Rainbow Kingdom, and this time, it was announced to have ten 22-24-minute episodes in a season, and slated to be released in 2017. In the announcement, Pharrell Williams' I Am Other was also included in the list of companies.

Characters
 True is an 8-year-old strong heroine who possesses a warm heart, a clever mind and boundless energy. She accepts every challenge head-on with a beaming smile; what makes True "truly" extraordinary is that she is the only one in the Rainbow Kingdom to activate the Wishes’ special powers that unleash magical energy. Voiced by Michela Luci.
 Bartleby is True's funny cat sidekick who has a lot of bravado and the gift of gab. However, only his best friend True knows he is actually a bit of a scaredy-cat. He is, as replied by True, an opinionated cat and provides a lot of commentary, which helps trigger True's creative problem-solving skills. Voiced by Jamie Watson.
 Rainbow King is the lovable ruler of the Rainbow Kingdom. He is a kind, sympathetic and humble king. Though he possesses a wealth of knowledge, he shares his wisdom in riddles by adding fun complexity to True's adventures. He does anything to help True on her journey but he knows that "true" success is achieved when True solves all of the problems with him. Voiced by Eric Peterson.
 Zee is True's buddy, an apprentice to the Rainbow King, and the wish keeper. He is one or two years older than True. Being a trained Wishologist, he takes care of the Wishes and knows all about their strengths and powers. Meanwhile, when a problem arises in the kingdom, True seeks out Zee's advice and wish help in the Wishing Tree. Voiced by Dante Zee in seasons 1 and 2 and later by Nicolas Aqui starting with season 3.
 Grizelda is a self-centered young princess. Deep down, she realizes she needs a friend like True. Although True tries to reach out to the Princess, Grizelda's self-absorbed ways can make that challenging; however, love in Rainbow Kingdom is unconditional, so True never stops trying. The best reason for Grizelda is that someone who is a little selfish means she needs a little more love, for some reason. Voiced by Anna Bartlam.
 Frookie is a dog and Grizelda's sidekick. He looks out for the difficult princess because he knows the inner Grizelda is not so bad.
 The Wishes are various non-verbal but highly expressive wishes which communicate with goofy gestures and sweet sounds. Each one has a unique, big personality that complements or contrasts their power. The Wishes share a special bond with True but until they are called to action, they stay busy training with Zee. Each Wish is imbued with a special power that only True can "spark".

Other characters
 Yetis are creatures that live in The Rainbow Kingdom and communicate in "Yeti-ish". There is, however, one word known to all Yetis that they'll greet you with accompanied by a big wave, which is a loud and friendly "hi" to everyone in the Rainbow Kingdom country.
Urg and Snick is a Yeti couple who live in Yeti Village located in The Never Ending Forest. The only couple to speak “Yeti-ish” (aside from the Rainbow King), True is usually a translator for their Yeti friends.
Grock, Yerk and Floof are Urg and Snick's baby Yeti triplets. Grock and Yerk are girls and Floof is a boy. They are close friends to True and Bartelby.

Rainbow citizens
 Grizmos is Grizelda's sidekicks who act as her servants and live in a cave beneath her castle.
 Cumulo is a cumulus cloud whom True and Bartleby ride on to get around the Rainbow Kingdom.
 Glummy Glooma is the Rainbow King's gloomy cousin who prefers everything be gloomy, whether anyone likes it or not. He also acts as the Grand Marshal of Grabbleapple Fest, as it is his yearly duty to bring the grey clouds of Autumn and change the seasons. 
 Little Helpers are little four-armed critters found all around The Rainbow Kingdom, keeping it running with their helpful duties.
 Mila is a little girl who is a citizen of Rainbow City. She has a giant pet stink critter named "Stinko", no longer stinky thanks to True, Bartleby, and the wishes. She is also friends with Rocky the Rock Critter.
Rocky is a Rock Critter who befriends Mila and The Rainbow King, in addition to True and Bartleby. However, True is the only character not to speak "Rock-ish".  
 Bingo Bango is a boombox shaped DJ which is a bit shy and soft-spoken. It rocks the house of any party with his music.
 The Wishing Tree is a very important tree standing atop the Rainbow Castle where Zee, the Wish Keeper/Wishologist studies the Wishes that live there. Wee wishes are brought to the tree by the Rainbow King who collects them from Wishing Heart Hollow in the Never Ending Forest. True and Bartleby go here to ask Zee for advice to solve a problem with the help of Wishes.
 Shadow and Silverclaw are masters of The Kittynati, an ancient tribe of cat ninjas. After being invited to train with the duo at The Black Tabby Dojo, Bartleby eventually trades in his Yellow Tabby Belt for his Red Tabby Belt, making him a true Ninja Cat and Kittynati.

Episodes

Season 1 (2017)
The first season of the series, entitled The Rainbow Kingdom, was released on Netflix on August 11, 2017.

Season 2 (2018)
The second season of True and the Rainbow Kingdom, entitled True: Magical Friends and True: Wonderful Wishes, was released as a standalone series on Netflix on June 18.

Season 3 (2019)
The third season of True and the Rainbow Kingdom, entitled Mushroom Town and Wild Wild Yetis, was released on Netflix on May 3 and August 30, 2019.

Related productions

Dance and Sing with True (2018)
A collection of songs featuring characters from the show.

True Tunes (2019)
On July 12, 2019, a collection of 8 original True and the Rainbow Kingdom-themed music videos were released on Netflix under the title True Tunes, featuring re-imagined versions of classic kids' songs based around the world and characters of the show.

True: Terrific Tales (2020)
A fairy-tale inspired spin-off series.

Specials
A number of additional specials were released: the Valentines Day special TRUE: Happy Hearts Day, the Easter special TRUE: Wuzzle Wegg Day, the Halloween Special TRUE: Tricky Treat Day, the Christmas special TRUE: Winter Wishes, the Thanksgiving special TRUE: Grabbleapple Harvest, the special TRUE: Rainbow Rescue, and the special TRUE: Friendship Day.

Release
A sneak peek screening of the series was held on July 10, 2017 at a Pacific Theatres venue at The Grove at Farmers Market in Los Angeles. Among the attendees and guests were Frank Falcone, Bill Schultz, Pharrell Williams, the FriendsWithYou duo, Kelly Rowland, Christina Milian, and Tyga. The series was premiered on Netflix on August 11, 2017.

The second season began in production in 2017, slated to premiere in 2018. Later, Netflix announced that the second season would be released two standalone titles, True: Magical Friends and True: Wonderful Wishes, on June 15, 2018.

On September 28, 2017, another season of the series, which was scheduled to debut in 2019, was announced. The season, entitle Mushroom Town, was released on Netflix on May 3, 2019.

On May 18, 2018, Netflix launched Dance and Sing with True, a collection of music videos for remixes of songs from the show. On October 2, 2018, Netflix announced they will release specials and shorts. Shortly after, they confirmed another season.

Awards and nominations

Merchandises and other media
As announced in February 2017, Home Plate Entertainment has appointed Brand Central in Los Angeles as the licensing agent of True and the Rainbow Kingdom. In August 2017, it was announced that Toy State has become the master toy licensee of the property, with first products to be released in fall 2018. In May 2018 announcement, more licensees, as brokered by Brand Central, were added. One of the newly named license holders was Chouette, which was given master publishing rights. The announcement stated that the products would be launched in fall 2018 in the United States, and in 2019 the rest of the world.

References

External links
 
 True and the Rainbow Kingdom on Netflix
 

2010s American animated television series
2010s American children's television series
2010s Canadian animated television series
2010s Canadian children's television series
2017 American television series debuts
2017 Canadian television series debuts
2020s American animated television series
2020s American children's television series
2020s Canadian animated television series
2020s Canadian children's television series
American children's animated adventure television series
American children's animated fantasy television series
American computer-animated television series
American preschool education television series
Animated preschool education television series
Canadian children's animated adventure television series
Canadian children's animated fantasy television series
Canadian computer-animated television series
Canadian preschool education television series
2010s preschool education television series
2020s preschool education television series
Netflix children's programming
Animated television series by Netflix
Works by Pharrell Williams
Animated television series about children
CBC Kids original programming
English-language Netflix original programming